The Emperor Valley Zoo  is the only zoo in Trinidad and Tobago.  It is located North of the Queen's Park Savannah and West of the Royal Botanic Gardens in Port of Spain.

The zoo was first opened on 8 November 1952 by Governor Sir Hubert Rance. At that time, there were 10 cages containing 127 animals, mainly indigenous species. It now has a collection of over 2300 individuals and over 200 species.

The zoo was named after the large, blue Emperor or Morpho butterfly which once frequented the valley in which the zoo is situated. It covers 7.2 acres.

There are both local and foreign animals: lions, ocelots, parrots, macaws and many more including snakes, caiman, wildfowl giraffes, tigers and others. The categories include small mammals, large cats, a reptile house, aquariums, a deer park, primates and ponds.

The zoo has undergone major upgrades over the past few years, both for upkeep to its existing infrastructure to bring it up to international standards as well as in preparation for additions to its animal stock. These upgrades have been undertaken by the Zoological Society of Trinidad and Tobago (ZSTT). with financial assistance from the government of Trinidad and Tobago to the value of TTD $56 Million.

During the upgrade period there has been the construction of a Giraffe enclosure, which was populated in December 2013 by two giraffes and the addition of a Tiger exhibit which received three tigers in 2014 - two white Bengals and a ginger Bengal. The White Bengals have successfully bred and have had two cubs in January 2015. 

On 12 October 2016, the zoo announced that they had received six llamas from a nature park in Texas, USA. Zoo officials stated that of the six llamas, four are female.

References

External links
 Emperor Valley Zoo website

Buildings and structures in Port of Spain
Tourist attractions in Port of Spain
Nature conservation in Trinidad and Tobago